Palaquium pseudocuneatum is a tree in the family Sapotaceae. The specific epithet pseudocuneatum means "somewhat wedge-shaped", referring to the leaf base.

Description
The bark is reddish to greyish brown. Inflorescences bear up to three flowers.

Distribution and habitat
Palaquium pseudocuneatum is endemic to Borneo. Its habitat is swamp and hill forests.

References

pseudocuneatum
Endemic flora of Borneo
Trees of Borneo
Plants described in 1927